Albeck is a surname. Notable people with the surname include:

Amnon Albeck, (born 1958) Israeli chemist
Andy Albeck (1921–2010), American film studio executive
Hanoch Albeck (1890–1972), Israeli Talmudist
Michael Albeck (born 1934), Israeli chemist; President of Bar-Ilan University
Stan Albeck (1931–2021), American basketball coach

See also
Rachel Albeck-Gidron (born 1960), Israeli multidisciplinary researcher